Daniel Freitas (born 20 November 1965) is a Uruguayan boxer. He competed in the men's lightweight event at the 1988 Summer Olympics. At the 1988 Summer Olympics, he lost to Giorgio Campanella of Italy.

References

External links
 

1965 births
Living people
Uruguayan male boxers
Olympic boxers of Uruguay
Boxers at the 1988 Summer Olympics
Sportspeople from Montevideo
Lightweight boxers